Julia Nicol (1956 – 3 April 2019) was a South African activist and librarian. Nicol worked with LGBT groups in South Africa and was a co-founder and leader of the Organisation of Lesbian and Gay Activists (OLGA).

Biography 
Nicol was born in 1956 in Johannesburg. She went to school at the University of Cape Town and worked as a librarian until her retirement in 1997.

Nicol started working as an LGBT activist in the beginning of the 1980s. She started the first organisation for lesbians in South Africa, called Lesbians in Love and Compromising Situations (LILACS). As an activist, Nicol was also involved with The Gay Association of South Africa (GASA) and was a founding member of Lesbians and Gays Against Oppression (LAGO). Later, LAGO became the Organisation of Lesbian and Gay Activists (OLGA) with Nicol and her partner, Sheila Lapinsky, the only lesbian members of the group and served in leadership roles. Lapinsky and Nicol were both directly responsible for ensuring that LGBT rights were part of the wider anti-apartheid movement.

Nicol died on 3 April 2019.

References 

1956 births
2019 deaths
South African LGBT rights activists
People from Johannesburg
South African librarians
University of Cape Town alumni
South African lesbians
South African women activists
Women librarians
Women civil rights activists
20th-century South African LGBT people
21st-century South African LGBT people